Harriet's Back in Town is a 1972 British television series produced by Thames Television.

The cast included Pauline Yates, William Russell, Edwin Richfield and Sally Bazely.

The show featured a newly divorced woman (Harriet Preston, played by Pauline Yates) and her plans for her new life. The first episode was shown on October 17, 1972 and the last (the 104th) exactly one year later on October 17, 1973. Most weeks featured two episodes on consecutive days. Pauline Yates would later star as Elizabeth Perrin in The Fall and Rise of Reginald Perrin.

The show also featured Geoffrey Hayes (later to find fame in the children's show Rainbow) as a taxi driver in two episodes.

References

External links

British drama television series
1970s British drama television series
1972 British television series debuts
1972 British television series endings
Television shows produced by Thames Television
English-language television shows